Paulo Pimenta (born 12 November 1960) is a Brazilian sports shooter. He competed in the men's 10 metre air rifle event at the 1984 Summer Olympics.

References

1960 births
Living people
Brazilian male sport shooters
Olympic shooters of Brazil
Shooters at the 1984 Summer Olympics
Sportspeople from Rio de Janeiro (city)